Vsevolod Mikhailovich Garshin (14 February 1855 – 5 April 1888) was a Russian author of short stories.

Life
Garshin was the son of an officer, from a family tracing its roots back to a 15th-century prince, who entered into the service of Ivan the Great. He attended secondary school and then the Saint Petersburg Mining Institute. He volunteered to serve in the army at the start of the Russo-Turkish War in 1877. He participated in the Balkans Campaign as a private, and was wounded in action. He was promoted to the rank of an officer at the end of the war. He resigned his commission soon after in order to devote his time to literary efforts. He had previously published a number of articles in newspapers, mostly reviews of art exhibitions.

His experiences as a soldier provide the basis for his first stories, including the very first, "Four Days" (Russian: "Четыре дня"), based on a real incident. The narrative is organized as the interior monologue of a wounded soldier left for dead on the battlefield for four days, face to face with the corpse of a Turkish soldier he had killed. Garshin's empathy for all beings is already evident in this first story.

Despite early literary success, he had periodical bouts of mental illness. Garshin attempted to commit suicide by throwing himself down the stone stairs leading to his apartment building. Although not immediately fatal, he died as a result of his injuries in a hospital in April 1888, at the age of 33.

Work

Garshin's work is not voluminous: it consists of some twenty stories, all of them included in a single volume. His stories are characterized by a spirit of compassion and pity that some have compared to Dostoevsky's.

In "A Very Short Novel" he examines the infidelity of a woman to a crippled hero. The story displays Garshin's talent for concentration and lyrical irony. "That Which Was Not" and "Attalea Princeps" are fables with animals and plants in human situations. The second of these stories has a sense of tragic irony. In "Officer and Soldier-Servant" he is a forerunner of Chekhov; it is an excellently constructed story conveying an atmosphere of drab gloom and meaningless boredom. "From the Reminiscences of Private Ivanov" — the title story in the most recent English language collection of Garshin's work — has the same Russo-Turkish War setting of "Four Days", and includes as minor players the characters from "Officer and Soldier-Servant".

His best-known and most characteristic story is "A Red Flower"; it fits in the series of lunatic-asylum stories in Russian literature (including Gogol's "Diary of a Madman" (1835), Leskov's The Rabbit Warren (1894) and Chekhov's "Ward No. 6" (1892)).

In 1883 Garshin was the model for the younger in Ilya Repin's painting Ivan the Terrible and His Son Ivan.

Gallery

References 

Article on Vsevolod Garshin and fan hysteria in the 1880s
Colleen Lucey. Violence, murder, and fallen women: prostitution in the works of Vsevolod Garshin Canadian Slavonic Papers 58, no.4 (2016)

External links 

 
 
 
 
 From the Reminiscences of Private Ivanov and other stories
 A collection of Garshin's stories translated to English

1855 births
1888 deaths
Russian pacifists
Russian male short story writers
Suicides by jumping in Russia
Russian people of Tatar descent
Russian military personnel of the Russo-Turkish War (1877–1878)
1880s suicides